Kashif Raza (Urdu: کاشف رضا) (born 26 December 1979) is a Pakistani cricketer. He is a right-handed batsman and a right-arm medium-fast bowler. He has played in one One Day International and played Twenty20 cricket during 2004–05. His involvement in first-class cricket goes back to 1999–2000. His main involvement has been in List A cricket. Though very talented, he waited for his comeback in international cricket for several years until finally he decided to retire in 2012. After retirement, Raza decided to move to Canada, and started coaching Alberta cricket.

References

1979 births
Living people
Pakistan One Day International cricketers
Pakistani cricketers
Sheikhupura cricketers
Water and Power Development Authority cricketers
Hyderabad (Pakistan) cricketers
Sialkot cricketers
Redco Pakistan Limited cricketers
Lahore Division cricketers
Sialkot Stallions cricketers
Punjab (Pakistan) cricketers
Cricketers from Sheikhupura